Louis "Lou" Otten (November 5, 1883 in Rijswijk – November 7, 1946 in The Hague) was a Dutch football (soccer) player who competed in the 1908 Summer Olympics. He was a member of the Dutch team, which won the bronze medal in the football tournament.

Otten was elected a corresponding member of the Royal Netherlands Academy of Arts and Sciences in 1934.

References

External links
profile

1883 births
1946 deaths
Association football defenders
Dutch footballers
Footballers at the 1908 Summer Olympics
Medalists at the 1908 Summer Olympics
Members of the Royal Netherlands Academy of Arts and Sciences
Olympic footballers of the Netherlands
Olympic bronze medalists for the Netherlands
Netherlands international footballers
People from Rijswijk
Olympic medalists in football
Footballers from South Holland